The  is the 20th constructed and 18th operating temple of the Church of Jesus Christ of Latter-day Saints (LDS Church). Located in Minato, Tokyo, Japan, it was the first temple built in Asia, being dedicated in 1980. It has a compact style that was a precursor for later buildings in urban areas, such as the Hong Kong China and Manhattan New York temples.

History
The intent to construct a temple in Tokyo was announced by the LDS Church on August 9, 1975. The temple was built on less than half an acre, on the site of the former mission home in downtown Tokyo. The mission home had to be demolished for the temple construction to proceed. The temple is very compact, with a parking garage in the basement and an apartment on one of the upper floors for the temple president. The exterior of the temple is reinforced concrete covered with 289 pre-made panels of stone, which look like light gray granite.

An open house was held September 15 through October 18, 1980, to allow the public to see the interior of the new temple. Church president Spencer W. Kimball dedicated the Tokyo Japan Temple October 27, 1980. On December 10, 2004, a ceremony was held in which an angel Moroni statue was added to the spire of the temple. 

In June 2000, the Fukuoka Japan Temple was dedicated in Fukuoka. Ground was broken for the Sapporo Japan Temple on October 22, 2011.

On April 10, 2017 the LDS Church announced that the temple would close in October 2017 for renovations that were originally anticipated to be completed in 2020. After delays due to the COVID-19 pandemic, the LDS Church announced on March 23, 2022 that a public open house would be held from June 3 through 18, 2022, excluding Sundays.  The temple was rededicated by Henry B. Eyring on July 3, 2022.

Presidents
Notable presidents of the temple include Adney Y. Komatsu (1982–85); Sam K. Shimabukuro (1985–88); and Yoshihiko Kikuchi (1994–97).

See also

 Comparison of temples of The Church of Jesus Christ of Latter-day Saints
 List of temples of The Church of Jesus Christ of Latter-day Saints
 List of temples of The Church of Jesus Christ of Latter-day Saints by geographic region
 Temple architecture (Latter-day Saints)
 The Church of Jesus Christ of Latter-day Saints in Japan

References

External links
 
 Tokyo Japan Temple Official site
 Tokyo Japan Temple at ChurchofJesusChristTemples.org
  Tokyo Japan Temple page with interior photos

20th-century Latter Day Saint temples
Christianity in Tokyo
Religious buildings and structures in Tokyo
Religious buildings and structures completed in 1980
Temples (LDS Church) in Japan
The Church of Jesus Christ of Latter-day Saints in Japan
1980 establishments in Japan